Rostam Khan (fl. second half of the 17th century) was a Safavid military commander, gholam, and official from the Georgian Saakadze family. He served as commander-in-chief (sepahsalar-e Iran), commander of the musketeer corps (tofangchi-aghasi), chancellor/chief justice (divanbegi), and governor (beglarbeg) of the Azerbaijan Province under king (shah) Suleiman I (1666-1694).

Rostam Khan was a son of Safiqoli Khan, and a namesake to his prominent grandfather, who also held the position of commander-in-chief and beglarbeg of Azerbaijan. 

According to Italian traveller Gemelli Careri, when Rostam Khan's nephew Bijan Beg fell out of favor during Shaykh Ali Khan Zanganeh's vizierate, he was saved through Rostam Khan's intervention.

Sources
 
  
 
 
 

17th-century births
Iranian people of Georgian descent
Commanders-in-chief of Safavid Iran
Tofangchi-aghasi
Safavid governors of Azerbaijan
Nobility of Georgia (country)
Shia Muslims from Georgia (country)
17th-century people of Safavid Iran
Year of death unknown
Safavid ghilman